Aanpirannol is an Indian Malayalam-language television series directed by Siva Mohan Thampi. The show premiered on 1 November 2021 on Amrita TV. It stars Riya Kuriyakose in the titular role along with Parvathy, Mukundan and Devi Ajith in pivotal roles. It is the first show in the history of Indian television that portrays the life of the transgender community.

Cast
 Riya Kuriyakose as Apoorva / Appu
 Parvathy Iyer as Malavika
 Mukundan as Vijay Panicker
 Devi Ajith
 Krishnachandran
 Vanitha Krishnachandran as Daisy Teacher
Divya M Nair as Aswathi 
 Sanuraj / Ananthu Sheeja as Dr.Jobin Alex
 Rahul as Arun
 __ as Dr.Aravind
 Resh Lakshna as Dr.Aleena

Production

Casting 
Debutant Riya Kuriyakose was cast as the protagonist, Apoorva. Parvathy, Mukundan and Devi Ajith were also cast in pivotal roles.

Release 

The title song video of Aanpirannol was released by Jayasurya in October 2021. The show premiered on Amrita TV on 1 November 2021. It is telecasted daily at the 7:00 p.m. (IST) time slot.

Soundtrack

References

External links 

 Official website 

Indian television series
Malayalam-language television shows
2021 Indian television series debuts
2020s LGBT-related television series
Transgender-related television shows
Indian LGBT-related television shows